Skeleton Lake Water Aerodrome  is located  west northwest of Skeleton Lake, Ontario, Canada.

References

Registered aerodromes in Ontario
Seaplane bases in Ontario